"Lateralus" is a song by American progressive metal band Tool. The song is the third single and title track of their third studio album Lateralus.

Overview and background
The song is known for its distinct time signatures and corresponding lyrical patterns. The time signatures of the chorus of the song change from 9/8 to 8/8 to 7/8; as drummer Danny Carey says, "It was originally titled 9-8-7. For the time signatures. Then it turned out that 987 was the 16th number of the Fibonacci sequence. So that was cool."

Interpretation
In a 2001 interview, singer Maynard James Keenan commented on the lyric mentioning black, white, red and yellow: "I use the archetype stories of North American aboriginals and the themes or colors which appear over and over again in the oral stories handed down through generations. Black, white, red, and yellow play very heavily in aboriginal stories of creation."

The line "As below so above and beyond, I imagine" is a reference to Hermeticism and the Emerald Tablet.

Mathematical significance
In July 2017, Maynard's friend Joe Rogan described his writing process in his podcast; "He wrote a song to the Fibonacci sequence. The Fibonacci sequence is a mathematical sequence. It starts from one, the next number is one, and the next number being two, creates the 2+1 which is three, continuing in this mathematical progression. That's how they found the chord progression. It began linking up to the Fibonacci sequence." The syllables Maynard sings in the first verse follow the first six numbers in the pattern, ascending and descending in the sequence 1-1-2-3-5-8-5-3. "Black (1), then (1), white are (2), all I see (3), in my infancy (5). Red and yellow then came to be (8), reaching out to me (5). Lets me see (3)." In the next verse, Maynard begins with the seventh number of the Fibonacci sequence (13), implying a missing verse in between. He descends back down with the following pattern; 13-8-5-3. "As below so above and beyond I imagine (13). Drawn beyond the lines of reason (8). Push the envelope (5). Watch it bend (3)." The second verse adds the missing line to complete the sequence; "There is (2), so (1), much (1), more that (2), beckons me (3), to look through to these (5), infinite possibilities (8)." 1-1-2-3-5-8-5-3-2-1-1-2-3-5-8-13-8-5-3.

Reception
Loudwire listed "Lateralus" as number one on their list of the Top 50 Metal Songs of the 21st Century.

Chart performance

References

2001 singles
Tool (band) songs
Volcano Entertainment singles
2001 songs
Songs written by Maynard James Keenan
Songs written by Danny Carey
Songs written by Justin Chancellor
Songs written by Adam Jones (musician)